Welcome to 18 (alternative title: Summer Release) is a 1986 American coming of age comedy-drama film directed by Terry Carr, who also wrote the screenplay with Judith Sherman Wolin. It stars Mariska Hargitay, Courtney Thorne-Smith and JoAnn Willette.

Plot
The film follows the adventures of three high school girls the summer after they graduate. After their jobs at a dude ranch fail to work out, the girls head to Lake Tahoe where they meet Talia (Cristen Kauffman). Talia's boyfriend Roscoe then helps the girls get a job at a casino which leads to trouble.

Cast
 Mariska Hargitay as Joey
 Courtney Thorne-Smith as Lindsey
 JoAnn Willette as Robin
 Cristen Kauffman as Talia
 E. Erich Anderson as Roscoe
 Graham Ludlow as Pipes

References

External links
 
 
 

1986 films
1980s coming-of-age comedy-drama films
1986 independent films
1980s teen comedy-drama films
American coming-of-age comedy-drama films
American independent films
American teen comedy-drama films
Films set in California
Films shot in California
1986 directorial debut films
1980s English-language films
1980s American films